Zinc finger protein 84 is a protein that in humans is encoded by the ZNF84 gene.

References

Further reading 

Human proteins